Detours is a live album by Canadian progressive rock band Saga. It was recorded during their European Tour in 1997.

Track listing

Notes
 The first disc of the original release contains a live video of "The Pitchman"
 The second disc of the original release contains a live video of "Intermission"
 "You're Not Alone" is a combination of the remake (from Pleasure & the Pain) and the original version
 "Humble Stance" ends after 7:20, it's followed by about 90 seconds of silence and then Steve Negus' drum solo plays as a hidden track

Personnel
 Ian Crichton – guitars
 Jim Crichton – bass, keyboards
 Jim Gilmour – keyboards, vocals
 Steve Negus – drums
 Michael Sadler – vocals, keyboards

Production
 Produced by Jim Crichton
 Engineered by John Henning
 Mixed by John Henning, Assisted by Chris Morrison
 Mixed at Sound Image Studios, L.A.
 Concept and Front Cover Photo by Jim Crichton
 Cover and Photos by Penny Crichton for Picture This Productions, Inc.

References

Saga (band) albums
1999 live albums
SPV/Steamhammer live albums